Erasmus Student Network (ESN) is a Europe-wide student organisation.

The organization supports and develops student exchanges, both inside the Erasmus+ programme and outside of it. The local ESN sections offer help, guidance and information to both exchange students and students doing a full degree abroad – by informing them, but also providing them with different trips or events. National and international level support the local level by providing necessary tools, as well as communicating with National Erasmus+ Organizations or the European Commission in general.

The goal of the organisation is to support and develop student exchange on the local, national and international levels. It is composed of around 15.000 members in over 530 local sections in 42 countries in Higher Education Institutions, including universities, polytechnics, and university colleges.

History
In 1987, the European Community approved a plan to create a mobility scheme for higher education. Part of it was the Erasmus programme – an exchange programme for students to provide students with the opportunity to spend part of their studies abroad.

In 1989 the Erasmus Bureau invited 32 former Erasmus Students for an evaluation meeting in Ghent, Belgium. This meeting was the starting point for the Erasmus Student Network. The lack of peer-to-peer support was singled out as a major issue and the driving force behind the creation of the Erasmus Student Network, named for the Dutch Renaissance humanist Erasmus of Rotterdam.

By 1994 ESN had 60 sections in 14 countries. In 2004 the ESN network consisted of 170 sections in and outside Europe, from Scandinavia to Morocco. In 2005, ESN established its headquarters in Brussels and legally registered as a Belgian non-profit organisation.

As of 23 July 2020, the Erasmus Student Network consists of 534 local associations ("sections") in 42 countries and has more than 15.000 volunteers across Europe.

The organization supports students from Erasmus programme and other bilateral agreement. It cooperates with national agencies in order to help international students – it does not, however, send people on exchange itself, this being done by Universities and national organizations.

Structure

ESN works on three levels – local, national and international. It is only active within the borders defined by the Council of Europe.

Local level
ESN on local level consists of "sections" that directly work with the international students. They organize activities like introduction programmes, get-togethers and cultural events and represent the exchange students and their needs towards academic institutions and local authorities. Every year, representatives of the local sections meet at the Erasmus Generation Meeting (EGM).

National level
The national level represents the needs of international students towards governments and national authorities. Local sections in the same countries form a National Platform (NP) and, each year, they elect a National Board which represents the local sections on the international level.

International level
The International Board is the executive body of ESN International and consists of five board members (president, vice-president, treasurer, communication manager and web project administrator). Since 2005, the members of the International Board are full-time volunteers living and working in Brussels. The International Board is supported by the secretariat composed of employed staff and trainees.

ESN has five International Committees that work together with its respective international board member in charge. The Committees of ESN are – International Committee for Education (ICE), Network Committee (NEC), Finance Committee (FICO), Communication Committee (ComCom) and IT Committee (IT).

International events
Since its foundation in 1989, ESN holds Annual General Meetings (AGM), alternating in major cities throughout Europe.

Other activities include annual Cultural Medleys (CM) from 1999 until 2012, and annual meetings of the organization's five Regional Platforms. These Regional Platforms are:
 Central European Platform (CEP) – Austria, Belarus, Croatia, Czech Republic, Hungary, Poland, Slovakia, Slovenia and Ukraine.
 Northern European Platform (NEP) – Denmark, Estonia, Finland, Iceland, Latvia, Lithuania, Norway, Russia and Sweden
Western European Platform (WEP) – Luxembourg, Belgium, Germany, Ireland, the Netherlands, Switzerland and the United Kingdom
South-Western European Platform (SWEP) – France, Italy, Malta, Portugal and Spain
South-Eastern European Platform (SEEP) – Azerbaijan, Bosnia and Herzegovina, Bulgaria, Cyprus, Georgia, Greece, North Macedonia, Romania, Serbia and Turkey.

References

External links

Student organizations established in 1989
Student exchange
Desiderius Erasmus
Organizations with participatory status with the Council of Europe
European student organizations
Erasmus Programme